Hot Lake Hotel (also known as Hot Lake Resort) is a historic Colonial Revival hotel originally built in 1864 in Hot Lake, Union County, Oregon, United States. The hotel received its namesake from the thermal spring lakes on the property, and operated as a luxury resort and sanitorium during the turn of the century, advertising the medicinal attributes of the mineral water and drawing visitors worldwide. It is also the first known commercial building in the world to utilize geothermal energy as its primary heat source.

After a fire burned down over half of the hotel in 1934, the remaining building was used for various purposes, including a retirement home, asylum, and a nurse's training school during World War II. After that, operations were intermittent under various owners before the building's abandonment in 1991. The hotel and surrounding structures were added to the National Register of Historic Places in 1979.

Today, it is operated as a hot springs resort, pub, and theater. Previous restoration done by the Manuels. Prior owners included future governor Walter M. Pierce and former state senator Parish L. Willis.

Background

The hot springs that make up Hot Lake themselves rest at the foot of a large bluff, and were often used by Native Americans before settlement and colonization occurred in the area; the lake was named "Ea-Kesh-Pa" by the Nez Perce. It is thought by historians that Hot Lake was one of the first thermal springs to be visited by European settlers, and the springs themselves were documented by Washington Irving in his recording of Robert Stuart's explorations during the Astor Expedition in 1812. Irving wrote in his record:

Emerging from the chain of Blue Mountains, they descended upon a vast plain, almost a dead level, sixty miles in circumference, of excellent soil ... In traversing this plain, they passed, close to the skirt of the hills, a great pool of water, three hundred yards in circumference, fed by a sulphur spring, about ten feet in diameter, boiling up in one corner. The place was much frequented by elk, which were found in considerable numbers in the adjacent mountains, and their horns, shed in the spring-time, were strewed in every direction around the pond.

After the Oregon Trail expedition brought settlers into the area, the land surrounding the lakes was utilized as a cattle ranch, and was purchased by a sailor named Tommy Atkins. An apocryphal story claiming that Atkins was cured of numerous health ailments after falling into the spring was published in The Oregonian in 1914 in a piece detailing the hotel's history. The lake's spring bubbles nearly a half-million gallons of water each day, and the average temperature of the lake is around 200°F (93°C).

History

1864–1906: Initial construction
In 1864, Samuel Fitzgerald Newhart, a native of California, arrived in the Grande Ronde Valley, and constructed the original wooden structure on the lake, which faced toward the bluff rather than outward toward the lake. The structure was similar to the contents of a modern-day shopping mall, containing a post office, blacksmith, dance hall, barber shop, bath house, and several other businesses.

By 1884, the Union Pacific Railroad commenced its construction, running near Hot Lake. In 1903, the original wooden structure was demolished, and construction began on a new hotel and various bath houses. Dr. Phy became involved with the project in 1904, and a brick structure intended for use as a hospital began construction.

1907–1933: Heyday

Well-renowned architect John V. Bennes of nearby Baker City has been attributed to the architectural design of the building, reminiscent of the Colonial era; Bennes also designed numerous buildings on the Oregon State University campus, as well as several buildings in Portland. In 1908, the main brick wing of the hotel was completed, which alone comprised 65,000 square feet. The construct featured a Georgian-style U-shape with a solarium facing the bluff. The building was heated with the geothermal waters, and was the first known commercial property in the world to use geothermal heating.

Upon its re-opening, the hotel housed a total of 105 guest rooms, a 60-bed surgical ward, a ballroom, a barber shop, confectionery, drug store, news stand, reception rooms, laboratories, and a commissary. The hospital featured state-of-the-art soaking tubs supplied by the lake water, as well as an operating room complete with an elevated observation deck, and a 1,500-guest dance hall. The hotel came to be known by locals as "The Town Under One Roof," and was a mostly self-sufficient property, producing its own vegetables, dairy products, meats, and eggs.

In 1910, the hotel grossed $178,811 in yearly revenue, and the use of the building's geothermal heating system reportedly saved $15,000 per year in heating costs. In 1911, a show barn was built on the property, and in 1912, the Central Railroad of Oregon built a  line from Richmond directly to the hotel, which marked the beginning of the building's heyday. In 1917, Dr. W.T. Phy purchased the hotel and resort, renaming it "Hot Lake Sanitorium". The building was from then on known not only as a resort for the rich, but also as a hospital for the ill; the geothermal mineral waters from the springs were used and experimented with to help treat patients and guests, making the resort a pioneering figure in western experimental medicine.

By 1924, the hotel had become a major tourist attraction, attracting visitors worldwide. The Mayo brothers, founders of the Mayo Clinic, were frequent visitors to the hotel, as well as Wild Bill Hickok. Staffing fifteen nurses, four physicians, an X-ray technician, and a bacteriologist, the hotel garnered a reputation as "The Mayo Clinic of the West."

A promotional advertisement from the Oregon Pacific Railroad promoted the purported healing properties of the waters, stating:

[Hot Lake Hotel] is the largest, hottest, and most curative springs known; best bathing facilities, most courteous attendants; first-class medical and surgical conveniences; finest operating room in the west; steam heat, electric lights; hot and cold water throughout the building

Other advertisements touted the drinking of the water as relieving a variety of ailments, as well as claiming mud baths and poultice made with lake sediment as being beneficial for treatment of rheumatism.

1934–1990: Fire and decline

Dr. Phy, the central manager and owner of the property, died in 1931 of pneumonia. On May 7, 1934, a fire destroyed the majority of the building's west wing, completely demolishing the wood structures of the hotel; the  brick portion of the building, however, survived the fire. Prior to the fire, the building had contained nearly 300 rooms and dining areas for over 1,000 guests. From then on, business at the hotel declined, and eventually the hospital area on the third floor was the only functioning business.

A flight school and nurse's training center was established at the hotel in 1939 during World War II, and U.S. Route 30 was later built, with Oregon Route 203 branching off of it and running right by the front of the hotel grounds. In 1941, the property was acquired by A.J. Roth, and was converted into a nursing home for the aged in 1951, and later an asylum. The building functioned as the asylum and rest home until 1974 when ownership of the building changed, and a short-lived restaurant and night club was opened, which operated unsuccessfully for two years; rumors of hauntings plagued the building from the late 1970s onward.

In the mid-1980s, Dr. Lyle Griffith purchased the property and used one corner of the hotel as a bath house; by 1991, the bath house closed down, and the hotel was abandoned, falling prey to local vandals and the elements; however, an RV park constructed in 1989 operated adjacent to the hotel.

1991–2002: Abandonment
The building sat abandoned and decrepit for over a fifteen-year period, in spite of having been purchased by the Seattle-based B.B.R. Holdings corporation. Various stories circulated concerning reported hauntings in the hotel— it has been rumored to be haunted by vacationers, a gardener who committed suicide, and residents who lived in the building during its use as an insane asylum. When the hotel was originally constructed it acquired a piano formerly owned by Robert E. Lee's wife, which was said to play all by itself up on the third floor.

Other reports of screaming and crying were reported by owner Donna Pattee and caretaker Richard Owens coming from the hospital's surgery room, as well as rocking chairs moving at their own accord; Pattee and her husband owned the property in the 1970s when it was a restaurant; both they and Owens lived on the second floor of the building at the time. Local rumors and legend concerning the hotel were pervasive, and in 2001 the property was featured on the ABC documentary series The Scariest Places on Earth.

2003–present: Restoration
In 2003, the building, which was literally falling apart, was purchased from Charles and Louise Rhea by David Manuel. Restoration began soon after; the building was greatly dilapidated, with all 368 windows broken and/or missing, and a sparsely-remaining roof. After two years of construction, it was opened to the public for tours in 2005, while individual guest rooms were still being sponsored and renovated. In 2008, the west wing of the building collapsed. the building previously functioned as a bed and breakfast, with dozens of restored rooms, a spa, restaurant, and a museum. The hotel's original pool was covered with landscape. 

The hotel is part of the Hot Lake Resort, which was listed on the National Register of Historic Places in 1979.

In culture
In addition to its appearance on The Scariest Places on Earth, the hotel was also used as a shooting location for a music video by musician Laura Gibson.

See also
National Register of Historic Places listings in Union County, Oregon
Reportedly haunted locations in Oregon

References

Bibliography

Further reading
 Roth, Richard R.  The Hot Lake Story (2008)  Heritage Quest Press, Orting, Washington  
 Roth, Richard R.  The Hot Lake Story - Heritage Supplement  (2011)  Heritage Quest Press, Orting, Washington  
 Roth, Richard R.  The Hot Lake Story - 2012 Supplement  (2012) Heritage Quest Press, Orting, Washington  
 Roth, Richard R.  The Central Railroad of Oregon - Oregon's Blue Mountain Route  (2015)  Heritage Quest Press, Orting, Washington

External links

Hot Lake Springs (official website)
"Hot Lake Springs: A reminder of gentler times" from USA Today
Images of Hot Lake Hotel from the University of Oregon Digital Archives
Oregon Historic Sites Database: Hot Lake Resort
Oregon Historic Sites Database: Hot Lake Resort Bath House

1864 establishments in Oregon
Art museums and galleries in Oregon
Buildings and structures in Union County, Oregon
Colonial Revival architecture in Oregon
Defunct hospitals in Oregon
Hotel buildings completed in 1868
Hotel buildings completed in 1908
Hotel buildings on the National Register of Historic Places in Oregon
Hot springs of Oregon
Museums in Union County, Oregon
National Register of Historic Places in Union County, Oregon
Reportedly haunted locations in Oregon
Shingle Style architecture in Oregon
Tourist attractions in Union County, Oregon
Bed and breakfasts in Oregon